A train melody is a succession of musically expressive tones played when a train is arriving at or about to depart from a train station. As part of train passenger operations, a train melody includes a parade of single notes organized to follow each other rhythmically to form a lilting, singular musical thought. In Japan, departing train melodies are arranged to invoke a feeling of relief in a train passenger after sitting down and moving with the departing train. In contrast, arriving train melodies are configured to cause alertness, such as to help travelers shake off sleepiness experienced by morning commuters.

Metro systems in several cities, including Budapest, Tokyo, Osaka, and Seoul mark train arrivals and departures with short melodies or jingles.

History

In 1844, French classical pianist Charles-Valentin Alkan composed Le chemin de fer ("The Railroad"), a programmatic étude for piano designed to depict the happy journey of train passengers from departing a train station to portraying the train pulling into a second station. It is frequently cited as the first musical representation of railway travel. The joyful melody of Le chemin de fer subsequently has been celebrated as a forerunner to Arthur Honegger's orchestral work Pacific 231, which also represents a locomotive.

In August 1971, the Japanese private railway company Keihan Electric Railway became the first railway in Japan to introduce train melodies. Most of Japan's railway network was owned by the state until 1987. The former Japanese National Railways (JNR) company was privatized at that time, and the network was split between six major companies in the Japan Railways Group and a range of smaller operators. Under JNR ownership, bells were used at stations to mark the arrival and departure of trains; but privatization gave local managers greater autonomy to customize their station environments. The idea of introducing more melodic alarms was developed, and this quickly spread after passengers reacted positively.

Characteristics
Originally, the melodies used on Japan's railways sounded more like alarms. However, since the 1990s more attention has been paid to creating tunes which fulfil several criteria: clearly marking a train's arrival and departure, encouraging timely but unhurried boarding and disembarking, making passengers feel calm and relaxed, and standing out above announcements and other noise. Railway companies have established that the ideal length of a train melody, based on the typical dwell time of a train at a station, is seven seconds—so many tunes are designed to fit that length. Hundreds of different melodies—most written specifically for the railways—exist, and many stations or routes have their own characteristic tunes.

Reception
Train melodies have proved to be popular with many people in Japan. Train carriage and rolling stock manufacturer Nippon Sharyo received permission to use four different train melodies owned by East Japan Railway Company and West Japan Railway Company; and in August 2002 the company released an alarm clock that plays the same lilting melodies heard on Japan's high-speed railway lines. One tune is designed to invoke the relief a train passenger experiences after sitting down and moving with a departing train, and another is intended to reduce sleepiness, such as that experienced by morning commuters. By September 2002, Nippon Sharyo had sold out the first shipment of 2,000 units, priced at 5,800 yen. In view of the success of the product, the company launched a website dedicated to the clock, featuring the Shinkansen train's melodies. Other companies have manufactured keyrings and straps featuring the tunes.

There has also been criticism over the use of melodies on trains and at stations. These focus mainly on noise pollution and the tunes' contribution to it; but one author has also claimed that their use is symptomatic of a paternalistic, bureaucratic attitude towards passengers from the railway authorities, similar to the excessive use of announcements and warnings.

In other countries
SNCF in France uses a jingle by Michaël Boumendil:

Some National Rail stations in Great Britain use a four-tone British Rail jingle based on Jerusalem:

In Indonesia, most railways stations used full-hour segment of Westminster Quarters as its train melody. Upon arrival of a train, the chimes will be looped continuously until it departs from the station. Few stations are exceptions, with local folk songs acting as the train melody.

References

Rail transport operations
Railway culture in Japan
Jingles